CUCC may refer to:

 CUCC, a common abbreviation used by the following Cambridge University clubs:
 Cambridge University Caving Club
 Cambridge University Chamber Choir
 Cambridge University Cricket Club
 .cu.cc, a second level domain under the .cc ccTLD hierarchy